The Diocese of Cieszyn is the smallest diocese of the six which constitute the Polish Lutheran Church. The Bishop's See is Cieszyn, but the diocese is headquartered in Bielsko-Biała.

Location 
The Diocese of Cieszyn comprises Bielsko County and Cieszyn County in Silesian Voivodship, mostly encompassing the Polish part of the historical region of Cieszyn Silesia (only the parish in Biała lies without historical Cieszyn Silesia).

History 
Cieszyn Silesia was historically inhabited by a large Lutheran minority since the 16th century. A structure of parishes within Austrian Lutheran Church was established after issuing the Patent of Toleration in 1781. After World War I, the fall of Austria-Hungary, the Polish–Czechoslovak War, and the division of Cieszyn Silesia in 1920, the parishes that became a part of the Second Polish Republic joined the Polish Lutheran Church, first as a seniority, then in 1936 formally constituted as a diocese.

List of Bishops 
Paweł Nikodem : 1937~1954
Vacant (1954~1957)
Adam Wegert : 1957~1980
Jan Szarek : 1980~1991
Paweł Anweiler : 1992~2016
Adrian Korczago : 2016~

List of parishes 
22 parishes belong to the Diocese of Cieszyn:

References

External links 
Information of The Diocese of Cieszyn (pol.)

Evangelical Church of the Augsburg Confession in Poland
Lutheran dioceses in Poland
Bielsko County
Cieszyn County